Prince Albert East-Cumberland was a constituency of the Legislative Assembly of Saskatchewan.

History 
The seat was created out of the Cumberland district.

Geography 
The district covered the eastern part of Prince Albert, Saskatchewan.

Representation 

 Bill Berezowsky (1967 to 1971)

References 

Former provincial electoral districts of Saskatchewan